The Alligator River gecko (Lucasium occultum) is a gecko native to Australia.

References

Lucasium
Reptiles described in 1982
Geckos of Australia
Taxa named by Max King (herpetologist)